Calum Stevenson (born 1997) is a Scottish contemporary artist.

Stevenson graduated with a BA(Hons) in Fine Arts from Duncan of Jordanstone College of Art & Design in 2019 and went on to graduate from Glasgow School of Art with a MA in Fine Art Practice in 2020.

In 2021, Stevenson became the youngest and first ever Scottish artist to win Sky Portrait Artist of the Year. In the final, Stevenson painted Barry Humphries from life, winning a £10,000 commission to paint Nicola Benedetti for the Scottish National Portrait Gallery. Stevenson’s work is now part of the permanent collection on display in Edinburgh.

References

External links
 Website
 Biography at Scottish National Portrait Gallery

1997 births
Alumni of the University of Dundee
21st-century Scottish painters
21st-century Scottish male artists
Scottish portrait painters
Living people